During the 1919–20 season Hearts competed in the Scottish Football League, the Scottish Cup and the East of Scotland Shield.

Fixtures

Wilson Cup

Rosebery Charity Cup

Scottish Cup

Scottish First Division

See also
List of Heart of Midlothian F.C. seasons

References
Statistical Record 19-20

External links
Official Club website

Heart of Midlothian F.C. seasons
Heart of Midlothian